Yancarlo Victorio Casas Acosta (born 15 July 1981) is a Peruvian footballer who plays as a defensive midfielder. He currently plays for Cienciano in the Torneo Descentralizado.

Club career
Casas was formed as footballer in the youth academy of Universitario de Deportes. He made his debut in the 2003 Torneo Descentralizado season. Then later that season he had a short spell with Ica based club Estudiantes de Medicina. The following season Casas returned to the capital and played the 2004 season in the Peruvian Second Division with Club Deportivo Municipal.

Then in 2005 Yancarlo returned the First Division by joining Arequipa giants FBC Melgar.
Casas scored his first goal in the Descentralizado on 12 November 2005 at home in the Estadio Monumental Virgen de Chapi against Sport Boys in the 2005 Clausura, which resulted in 1–0 win for his side.

In 2007, he joined Tacna based club Coronel Bolognesi FC.
Under the command of manager Freddy García, Yancarlo made his debut for Bolognesi FC in Round 5 of the 2007 Apertura in the 3–0 away loss to Total Clean FBC. He made 21 appearances and managed to score two goals in the league that season. The following season he made 24 league appearances in the 2008 Torneo Descentralizado, which was his last season with Bolo.

In January 2009, Casas joined Peruvian giants Sporting Cristal for the start of the 2009 season. He made 30 league appearances in his first season with his side finishing 10th in the Aggregate table that season. In the following 2010 season Casas played 39 matches and scored one goal, but still Sporting Cristal finished in mid-table 7th place. In his last season Yancarlo fell out of favor with the manager at the time Juan Reynoso and only managed to play in 13 league matches and 3 domestic cup matches in the 2011 season.

On 15 January 2012 Casas joined Cusco giants Cienciano for the 2012 season.

Honours

Club
Coronel Bolognesi FC
 Torneo Clausura: 2007

References

External links

1981 births
Living people
Footballers from Lima
Peruvian footballers
Club Universitario de Deportes footballers
Estudiantes de Medicina footballers
Deportivo Municipal footballers
FBC Melgar footballers
Coronel Bolognesi footballers
Sporting Cristal footballers
Cienciano footballers
Peruvian Primera División players
Peruvian Segunda División players
Association football midfielders